NGC 467 is an unbarred lenticular galaxy in the constellation Pisces. It was discovered on 8 October 1785 by William Herschel.

See also 
List of NGC objects (1–1000)

References

External links 

NGC 467 at spider.seds.org

Pisces (constellation)
Unbarred lenticular galaxies
0467
17851008
004736